The article provides details and data regarding the geographical distribution of all Polish speakers, regardless of the legislative status of the countries where it's spoken. The Polish language is the dominant language of Poland and it's spoken in authochtonous minority areas through Europe and in many immigrant communities in all over the world.

Statistics

Native speakers 
This table depicts the native speakers of the language, which means that the table includes people who have been exposed to the Polish language from birth and, thus, excludes people who use the language as a L2.

See also
 Geolinguistics

Notes

References 

Polish language
Polish